The 2005 Clemson Tigers football team represented Clemson University in the 2005 NCAA Division I-A football season.  The team was coached by Tommy Bowden and played their homes game at Memorial Stadium in Clemson, South Carolina.

Season
Clemson started off its season with wins over a ranked Texas A&M team and the Maryland Terrapins. However, Clemson then lost the following three games to Miami, Boston College, and Wake Forest.  The losses to Miami and Boston College came in overtime.  Clemson then rebounded to win the next two games against NC State and Temple. The next week, Clemson lost a close game to Georgia Tech.  Clemson then closed out the regular season with three straight wins over Duke, ACC rival Florida State, and instate rival South Carolina. In the post-season, Clemson received an invitation to play in the 2005 Champs Sports Bowl against Colorado.  Clemson won the game, 19–10, to finish the season at 8–4.

Clemson finished the season ranked in the top 25 (21st in both the AP and the Coaches' Poll) for the second time in three years. Clemson also recorded wins against three AP top 20 teams in the 2005 season for just the fourth time in school history.  Clemson lost its four games by a combined 14 points.

Schedule

Roster

Rankings

References

Clemson
Clemson Tigers football seasons
Cheez-It Bowl champion seasons
Clemson Tigers football